Tan Sri Dato' Lokman bin Yusof (11 September 1910 – 13 May 1972) was the first Mayor of Kuala Lumpur, Malaysia since it was officially conferred the status of a city on 1 February 1972. He formerly served as the Federal Capital Commissioner prior to his mayorship. Lokman died on 15 May 1972 and was succeeded by Yaacob Abdul Latiff.

Honours

Honours of Malaysia
  : 
 Companion of the Order of the Defender of the Realm (JMN) (1965)
 Recipient of the Malaysia Commemorative Medal (Silver) (PPM) (1965)
 Commander of the Order of Loyalty to the Crown of Malaysia (PSM) – Tan Sri (1971)
 :
 Recipient of the Meritorious Service Medal (PJK) (1961)
 Knight Commander of the Order of the Crown of Selangor (DPMS) – Dato' (1963)
 :
 Recipient of the Distinguished Conduct Medal (PPT) (1968)

Places named in honour of him
 SMK Datok Lokman, Jalan Kampung Pandan, Kuala Lumpur

References

Malaysian Muslims
Mayors of Kuala Lumpur
1910 births
Malaysian people of Minangkabau descent
1972 deaths
Companions of the Order of the Defender of the Realm
Commanders of the Order of Loyalty to the Crown of Malaysia
Knights Commander of the Order of the Crown of Selangor